Jared Rivers (born 18 October 1984) is a former Australian rules footballer who played for the Melbourne Football Club and Geelong Football Club in the Australian Football League (AFL).

Junior career

As a child Rivers supported the Sydney Swans, and cites Tony Lockett and Paul Kelly as his childhood heroes. He attended Caritas College until Year 10 and Sacred Heart College Senior, Adelaide afterwards.

He played junior football for the South Augusta Bulldogs Football club. He won a premiership with the club in 2000 at the age of 15, playing in the Spencer Gulf League. He was spotted by North Adelaide Football Club and began playing seniors under coach Darel Hart.

He was considered as a potential top ten draft pick, and was selected to play for South Australia's Under 18 team in the National competition. He injured his wrist in the lead up to this match, but scouts from the Melbourne Demons nonetheless selected him as the 27th pick overall in the 2002 AFL draft.

Senior career

Melbourne

Rivers played three games in his debut season, but was praised for his job on Port Adelaide's Warren Tredrea in his second match.

After a good performance in the preseason, Rivers won a place in the first team, and was subsequently nominated for Round 3 of National Bank Rising Star in 2004. He continued his good form throughout the season right until the Demons' loss to Essendon in the Elimination Final. In the week leading up to the Final, he was awarded the 2004 Rising Star award, chosen unanimously by the nine judges.

His season in 2005 was less successful, with poor form and injury culminating in him being dropped to the Sandringham team towards the end of the season. He was also suspended for two matches after striking Hawthorn's Ben Dixon.

Rivers returned to form the following season, becoming the premier defender of Melbourne Football Club, and playing his 50th career game against Port Adelaide at the MCG in Round 13.

Rivers is considered a master of the one percenter. He was able to move forward on many occasions in the 2006 season, including the Queens Birthday Match when he kicked his first two goals in AFL football.

Rivers was injured at the beginning of the 2007 season, and had little time on the field, suffering from a potentially season-threatening groin injury.

In 2008 Rivers was injured again, with a torn abdominal against the Magpies in the annual Queens Birthday match.

Geelong
On 18 October 2012, Rivers, an unrestricted free agent under the AFL's new free agency system, signed a 2-year contract with the Geelong Football Club.
In August 2015, he announced his retirement from the AFL due to chronic knee problems.

Post football career
Two months after his retirement, Rivers joined Collingwood's coaching staff as a development coach, replacing Craig McRae as part of a coaching restructure.

A year after joining Collingwood's coaching staff, Rivers was appointed coach of the VFL team, after Dale Tapping left to take up a role as an assistant coach with the Brisbane Lions. Rivers coached the VFL team until the end of the 2019 season.

in August 2020, Rivers joined Collegians Football Club in the VAFA as their head coach.

Statistics

|- style="background-color: #EAEAEA"
! scope="row" style="text-align:center" | 2003
|
| 27 || 3 || 0 || 0 || 4 || 1 || 5 || 2 || 8 || 0.0 || 0.0 || 1.3 || 0.3 || 1.7 || 0.7 || 2.7
|-
! scope="row" style="text-align:center" | 2004
|
| 27 || 22 || 0 || 0 || 130 || 129 || 259 || 109 || 49 || 0.0 || 0.0 || 5.9 || 5.9 || 11.8 || 5.0 || 2.2
|- style="background-color: #EAEAEA"
! scope="row" style="text-align:center" | 2005
|
| 27 || 14 || 0 || 0 || 98 || 66 || 164 || 79 || 23 || 0.0 || 0.0 || 7.0 || 4.7 || 11.7 || 5.6 || 1.6
|-
! scope="row" style="text-align:center" | 2006
|
| 27 || 22 || 4 || 4 || 166 || 129 || 295 || 118 || 58 || 0.2 || 0.2 || 7.5 || 5.9 || 13.4 || 5.4 || 2.6
|- style="background-color: #EAEAEA"
! scope="row" style="text-align:center" | 2007
|
| 27 || 3 || 0 || 0 || 17 || 22 || 39 || 16 || 8 || 0.0 || 0.0 || 5.7 || 7.3 || 13.0 || 5.3 || 2.7
|-
! scope="row" style="text-align:center" | 2008
|
| 27 || 6 || 0 || 1 || 28 || 38 || 66 || 23 || 9 || 0.0 || 0.2 || 4.7 || 6.3 || 11.0 || 3.8 || 1.5
|- style="background-color: #EAEAEA"
! scope="row" style="text-align:center" | 2009
|
| 27 || 20 || 0 || 0 || 113 || 108 || 221 || 86 || 63 || 0.0 || 0.0 || 5.7 || 5.4 || 11.1 || 4.3 || 3.2
|-
! scope="row" style="text-align:center" | 2010
|
| 27 || 18 || 0 || 1 || 142 || 94 || 236 || 106 || 44 || 0.0 || 0.1 || 7.9 || 5.2 || 13.1 || 5.9 || 2.4
|- style="background-color: #EAEAEA"
! scope="row" style="text-align:center" | 2011
|
| 27 || 20 || 1 || 1 || 130 || 143 || 273 || 88 || 51 || 0.1 || 0.1 || 6.5 || 7.2 || 13.7 || 4.4 || 2.6
|-
! scope="row" style="text-align:center" | 2012
|
| 27 || 22 || 13 || 10 || 171 || 111 || 282 || 109 || 41 || 0.6 || 0.5 || 7.8 || 5.0 || 12.8 || 5.0 || 1.9
|- style="background-color: #EAEAEA"
! scope="row" style="text-align:center" | 2013
|
| 25 || 10 || 0 || 2 || 50 || 53 || 103 || 26 || 24 || 0.0 || 0.2 || 5.0 || 5.3 || 10.3 || 2.6 || 2.4
|-
! scope="row" style="text-align:center" | 2014
|
| 25 || 22 || 0 || 1 || 157 || 128 || 285 || 125 || 47 || 0.0 || 0.0 || 7.1 || 5.8 || 13.0 || 5.7 || 2.1
|- style="background-color: #EAEAEA"
! scope="row" style="text-align:center" | 2015
|
| 25 || 12 || 0 || 0 || 99 || 66 || 165 || 77 || 25 || 0.0 || 0.0 || 8.3 || 5.5 || 13.8 || 6.4 || 2.1
|- class="sortbottom"
! colspan=3| Career
! 194
! 18
! 20
! 1305
! 1088
! 2393
! 964
! 450
! 0.1
! 0.1
! 6.7
! 5.6
! 12.3
! 5.0
! 2.3
|}

References

External links

1984 births
Living people
North Adelaide Football Club players
Melbourne Football Club players
Australian rules footballers from South Australia
AFL Rising Star winners
Geelong Football Club players
People educated at Sacred Heart College, Adelaide